is a metro station on the Osaka Metro Tanimachi Line in Tennoji-ku, Osaka, Japan.

History
December 17, 1968: "Shitennoji-mae (Yuhigaoka) Station" opened.
August 29, 1997: renamed "Shitennoji-mae Yuhigaoka Station".

Layout
There are two side platforms with two tracks on the first basement.

Surroundings
 Shitennō-ji
 Tennoji Police Station
 Osaka Immigration Office, Tennoji Branch

External links

 Official Site 
 Official Site 

Osaka Metro stations
Railway stations in Japan opened in 1968